Vera (: Véra, "faith") is a female given name of Slavic origin, and by folk etymology it has also been explained as Latin vera meaning "true". In Slavic languages, Vera means faith. The name Vera has been used in the English speaking world since the 19th century and was popular in the early 20th century.

Gender: Feminine

Usage: English, German, Italian, Spanish, Scandinavian, Slovak, Czech, Greek, Dutch, Slovene, Bulgarian, Serbian, Croatian, Macedonian, Portuguese, Russian, Albanian, French, Polish, Armenian, Hungarian, Romanian.

Other scripts: Вера (Russian, Bulgarian, Serbian, Macedonian), Βέρα (Greek)

Diminutives: Veer, Veerke, Veertje (Dutch), Verica (Serbian and Croatian), Verka or Vierka (Slovakian), Verochka (Russian).

Other languages: Véra (French), Věra (Czech), Veera (Finnish), Veer, Veerle (Dutch), Wiera (Polish), Vira (Ukrainian), Viera (Slovak), فيرا (Arabic)

Origin
In the Ancient Greek Christian faith, Saint Fides (Faith or Vera), her sisters Spes (Hope) and Caritas (Love) and their mother Sophia (Wisdom), died as martyrs in the second century AD during the persecution of Christians in the Roman Empire under the emperor Hadrian. The names are also the words designating the three key Christian virtues mentioned in Apostle Paul's First Epistle to the Corinthians (1 Corinthians 13:13).

In the English language, late 13c., verray "true, real, genuine," later "actual, sheer" (late 14c.), from Anglo-French verrai, Old French verai "true, truthful, sincere; right, just, legal," from Vulgar Latin *veracus, from Latin verax (genitive veracis) "truthful," from verus "true" (source also of Italian vero), from PIE root *were-o- "true, trustworthy." Meaning "greatly, extremely" is first recorded mid-15c. Used as a pure intensive since Middle English.

In Albanian the meaning of the word "verë" ([ˈvɛɾə]) is summer. The Albanian male version of the name Vera is Veriu which has the meaning "north" alb. (veri, veriu).

A
Vera Albreht (1895–1971), Slovene poet, writer, publicist and translator
Vera Alentova (born 1942), Soviet actress
Vera Allison (1902–1993), American Modernist jeweler, painter
Vera Altayskaya (1919–1978), Soviet actress
Vera Eugenia Andrus (1895–1979), American artist and printmaker
Vera Anisimova (born 1952), Soviet athlete
Vera Anstey (1889–1976), British economist
Vera Atkins (1908–2000), Romanian-born British intelligence officer during World War II

B
Vera Baboun (born 1964), Palestinian politician
Vera Baeva (1930–2017), Bulgarian writer and composer
Vera Baird (born 1950), British Labour Party activist, barrister, author and lecturer
Vera Baklanova (born 1947), Soviet Olympic diver
Vera Baranovskaya (1885–1935), Russian actress
Vera Barbosa (born 1989), Portuguese track and field athlete
Vera Barclay (1893–1989), British novelist and leading female pioneer Scouter
Vera Bazarova (born 1993), Russian pair skater
Vera Begić (born 1982), Croatian athlete
Véra Belmont (born 1938), French film producer, director and screenwriter
Vera Berdich (1915–2003), American printmaker
Vera Bergkamp (born 1971), Dutch politician
Věra Bílá (1954–2019), Romani musician and singer of Romani folk and pop songs
Vera Bjelik (1921–1944), Soviet World War II aircraft navigator
Vera Blagojević (1920-1942), Yugoslav political activist
Vera von Blumenthal, American potter and educator
Vera Bogetti (1902–1985), British stage and film actress
Vera Borea, French fashion designer
Vera de Bosset (1888–1982), Russian-born American dancer and artist
Vera Bradford (1904–2004), Australian classical pianist and teacher
Vera Brezhneva (born 1982), Ukrainian pop-singer and television presenter
Vera Brittain (1893–1970), English writer
Vera Broido (1907–2004), Russian-born British writer
Vera Brosgol (born 1984), Russian-born American cartoonist and animator
Vera Scantlebury Brown (1889–1946), Australian medical practitioner and pediatrician
Vera Brühne (1910–2001), German victim of miscarriage of justice
Vera Bryndzei (born 1952), Ukrainian speed skater
Vera Buchanan (1902–1955), American Democratic politician
Vera C. Bushfield (1889–1976), American politician

C
 Vera Alexandrovna Tiscenko Calder (1902–1983), Russian actress
 Vera Carmi (1914–1969), Italian film actress
 Vera Carrara (born 1980), Italian professional racing cyclist
 Vera Cáslavská (1942–2016), Czech gymnast
 Vera Caspary (1899–1987), American writer
 Vera Celis (born 1959), Belgian politician
 Věra Černá (born 1963), Czech artistic gymnast
 Vera Chapman (1898–1996), English author and founder of the first Tolkien Society
 Vera Chino (born 1943), Native American potter
 Vera Chirwa (born 1932), Malawian-born lawyer and human and civil rights activist
 Vera Chytilová (1929–2014), Czech film director
 Véra Clouzot (1913–1960), Brazilian-born French film actress and screenwriter
 Vera Coking, American eminent domain litigant
 Grand Duchess Vera Constantinovna of Russia (1854–1912), daughter of Grand Duke Konstantine Nicholaievich of Russia
 Princess Vera Constantinovna of Russia (1906–2001), youngest child of Grand Duke Konstantine Konstantinovich of Russia
 Vera Cordeiro (born 1950), Brazilian social entrepreneur and physician
 Vera Cornish, British stage and film actress
 Vera Cudjoe (born 1928), Trinidadian-Canadian actress, producer, and educator

D
 Vera Dajht-Kralj (1928–2014), Croatian Jewish sculptor
 Vera Day (born 1935), British film and television actress
 Vera Micheles Dean (1903–1972), Russian-American political scientist
 Vera Djatel (born 1984), Ukrainian footballer
 Vera Dua (born 1952), Belgian politician
 Vera Duarte, Cape Verdean human rights activist and politician
 Vera Ducas (1912–1948), Czechoslovak Jewish woman murdered in Israel reportedly for spying
 Vera Dulova (1909–2000), Russian harpist
 Vera Ðurašković (born 1949), Yugoslav basketball player
 Vera Dushevina (born 1986), Russian tennis player
Vera Duss (1910 — 2005), American-born French medical doctor and Roman Catholic nun

E
 Vera Elkan (1908–2008), South African photographer

F
 Vera Farmiga (born 1973), American actress of Ukrainian origin
 Vera King Farris (1938–2009), American zoologist and academic
 Vera Figner (1852–1942), Russian revolutionary
 Vera Filatova (born 1982), Ukrainian-born British actress
 Vera Fischer (actress) (born 1951), Brazilian actress
 Vera Fischer (sculptor) (1925–2009), Croatian sculptor
 Vera Flasarová (born 1952), Czech politician
 Vera Fogwill (born 1972), Argentine film and television actress, film director, and screenplay writer
 Vera Frances (born 1930), British actress
 Vera Francis, Native American writer and activist
 Vera Freeman (1865–1896), American stage actress
 Vera Friedländer (1928–2019), German writer and Holocaust survivor
 Vera Furness (1921–2002), English chemist and industrial manager

G
 Vera Mae Green (1928 - 1982), African American anthropologist, scholar, educator, author 
 Vera Galushka-Duyunova (1945–2012), Russian volleyball player
 Vera Gebuhr (1916–2014), Danish film actress
 Vera Gedroitz (1870–1932), Lithuanian princess, doctor of medicine and writer
 Vera Georgiyevna Orlova (1894—1977), Russian actress
 Vera Gornostayeva (1929–2015), Russian pianist
 Vera Grabe (born 1951), Colombian anthropologist and politician
 Vera Griner (1890–1992), Russian music teacher

H
 Vera Hall (1902–1964), American folk singer
 Vera Harsányi (born 1919, date of death unknown), Hungarian freestyle swimmer
 Vera Henriksen (1927–2016), Norwegian writer
 Vera Hilger (born 1971), German painter
 Vera Holland (1949–1996), English woman who was murdered
 Vera Louise Holmøy (born 1931), Norwegian judge
 Vera Holtz (born 1953), Brazilian television and cinema actress
 Vera Homp (born 1991), German footballer

I
 Vera Ilyina (born 1974), Russian diver
 Vera Inber (1890–1972), Russian-Soviet poet and writer
 Vera Int-Veen (born 1967), German journalist and television presenter
 Vera Isaku (born 1955), Albanian journalist

J
 Vera James (1892–19??), New Zealand-born theatre and film actor
 Věra Janoušková (1922–2010), Czech sculptor, painter and graphic artist
 Vera Jeftimijades (born 1937), Yugoslav fencer
 Vera Jocić (1923–1944), Yugoslav partisan
 Vera Johnson (1920–2007), Canadian folk singer
 Vera Jordanova (born 1975), Bulgarian-Finnish model and actress

K
 Vera Kamsha (born 1962), Russian author of high fantasy and journalist
 Vera Karalli (1889–1972), Russian ballet dancer, choreographer and silent film actress
 Vera Karmishina-Ganeeva (born 1988), Russian athlete
 Vera Katz (1933–2017), American Democratic politician
 Vera Kharuzhaya (1903–1942), Belarusian Communist writer and activist
 Vera Kholodnaya (1893–1919), Russian silent film actress
 Vera Kingston (1917–1996), English swimmer
 Vera Klement (born 1929), Polish-born American artist
 Věra Klimková (born 1957), Czechoslovak cross country skier
 Vera Kobalia (born 1981), Georgian politician
 Vera Koedooder (born 1983), Dutch professional racing cyclist
 Věra Kohnová (1929–1942), Czech Jewish diarist and concentration camp victim
 Vera Kolodzig (born 1985), German-Portuguese actress
 Vera Komarkova (1942–2005), Czech-born American mountaineer and botanist
 Vera Komisova (born 1953), Russian hurdler
 Vera Komissarzhevskaya (1864–1910), Russian actress
 Véra Korène (1901–1996), Russian-born French actress and singer
 Vera Koval (born 1983), Russian judoka
 Vera Krasnova (born 1950), Russian speed skater
 Vera Krasova (born 1987), Russian model and beauty queen
 Vera Krepkina (born 1933), Russian athlete
 Vera Kublanovskaya (1920–2012), Russian mathematician
 Věra Kůrková (born 1948), Czech computer scientist

L
 Vera Lantratova (1947–2021), Russian volleyball player
 Vera Leigh (1903–1944), British spy during World War II
 Vera Lengsfeld (born 1952), German politician
 Vera Leth (born 1958), Greenlandic Ombudsman
 Vera Lewis (1873–1956), American film and stage actress
 Vera Lindsay (1911–1992), British Shakespearean actress
 Vera Lischka (born 1977), Austrian breaststroke swimmer
 Vera G. List (1908–2002), American art collector and philanthropist
 Vera Liubatovich (1855–1907), Russian revolutionary
 Vera Bate Lombardi (1885–1948), English-born socialite
 Vera Lutter (born 1960), German-born American artist
 Vera Lynn (1917–2020), English singer
 Vera Lysklætt (born 1954), Norwegian politician

M
 Vera Mackey, Irish camogie player
 Vera MacLeavy (1919–2008), English librarian and Moravian Church archivist
 Vera Malinovskaya (1900–1988), Russian silent film actress
 Vera Manuel (1949–2010), Canadian First Nations writer
 Vera Maretskaya (1906–1978), Russian actress
 Vera Laughton Mathews (1888–1959), English Women's Royal Naval Service officer
 Vera Nikolaevna Maslennikova (1926–2000), Russian mathematician
 Vera Matović (born 1946), Serbian folk singer
 Vera Maxwell (1901–1995), American sportswear and fashion designer
 Vera McKechnie (born 1929), British children's television presenter
 Vera Menchik (1906–1944), British chess player
 Vera Michalski (born 1954), Swiss publisher
 Vera Miles (born 1929), American actress
 Vera Mischenko, Russian attorney and environmentalist
 Vera Misevich (1945–1995), Ukrainian equestrian
 Vera Moskalyuk (born 1981), Ukrainian-born Russian judoka
 Vera Mukhina (1889–1953), Russian sculptor
 Vera Myller (1880–1970), Russian mathematician who became the first female professor in Romania

N
 Véra Nabokov (1902–1991), wife, editor, and translator of Vladimir Nabokov
 Vera Nazarian (born 1966), Russian-born American fantasy and science fiction writer
 Vera Nazina (born 1931), Russian painter
 Vera Nebolsina (born 1989), Russian chess player
 Vera Neumann (1907–1993), American fashion designer
 Vera Nikolić (1948–2021), Serbian track and field athlete
 Vera Nikolić Podrinska (1886–1972), Croatian painter and baroness

O
 Vera Olcott (1893–19?), American dancer
 Vera Olsson (born 1974), Finnish television producer and television host
 Vera Georgiyevna Orlova (1894—1977), Russian Soviet actress
 Vera Markovna Orlova (1918—1993), Soviet Russian actress
 Vera Osoianu, Moldovan librarian, activist and writer

P
 Vera Page (1921-1931), British murder victim
 Vera Jayne Palmer (1933–1967), birth name of Jayne Mansfield, American actress
 Vera Panova (1905–1973), Soviet novelist, playwright, and journalist
 Vera Pauw (born 1963), Dutch football coach and former player
 Vera Pavlova (born 1963), Russian poet
 Vera Pearce (1895–1966), Australian stage and film actress
 Vera Perlin (1902–1974), Canadian humanitarian
 Vera Pezer (born 1939), Canadian curler and academic
 Vera Pless (1931–2020), American mathematician
 Vera Popkova (1943–2011), Soviet track and field athlete
 Vera Popova (1867–1896), Russian chemist
 Vera Pospíšilová-Cechlová (born 1978), Czech athlete
 Vera Putina (born 1926), Georgian woman who claims that Vladimir Putin is her lost son

R
 Vera Hruba Ralston (1919–2003), Czech-American skater and actress
 Vera Ramaciotti (1891—1982), Australian philanthropist
 Vera Renczi, Romanian serial killer
 Vera Reynolds (1899–1962), American film actress
 Vera Rich (1936–2009), British poet, journalist, historian, and translator
 Vera Ellen Westmeier Rohe (known as Vera-Ellen, 1921–1981), American actress
 Vera Rózsa (1917–2010), Hungarian singer
 Vera Rubin (1928-2016), American astronomer
 Věra Růžičková (1928-2018), Czech gymnast

S
 Vera Beaudin Saeedpour (1930–2010), American researcher and scholar
 Vera Salvequart (1919–1947), Czech-born German concentration camp nurse executed for war crimes
 Vera Santos (born 1981), Portuguese race walker
 Alina Vera Savin (born 1988), Romanian bobsledder
 Vera Scarth-Johnson (1912–1999), British-born Australian botanist and botanical illustrator
 Vera Schmidt (born 1982), Hungarian singer-songwriter
 Vera Schmidt (psychoanalyst) (1889–1937), Russian educationist and psychoanalyst
 Vera Schmiterlöw (1904–1987), Swedish actress
 Vera Schwarcz (born 1947), Romanian-born American sinologist and academic
 Vera Sessina (born 1986), Russian gymnast
 Vera Sheehan, Irish camogie player
 Vera Shimanskaya (born 1981), Russian rhythmic gymnast
 Vera Brady Shipman (1889-1932), American composer, journalist, and writer
 Vera Shitjeni (born 1974), Albanian politician
 Vera Shtelbaums (born 1937), Russian rhythmic gymnastics coach
 Vera Shvetsova (born 1929), Russian ballet teacher and balletmaster
 Eleonora Vera Sipos (1900–1988), New Zealand businesswoman, humanitarian and welfare worker
 Vera Sisson (1891–1954), American film actress of the silent era
 Vera Slutskaya (1874–1917), Russian revolutionary
 Vera Šnajder (1904–1976), Bosnian mathematician
 Vera Sobetova (born 1992), Russian sprint canoeist
 Vera Sokolova (born 1987), Russian race walker
 Vera T. Sós (born 1930), Hungarian mathematician
 Vera Sotnikova (born 1960), Soviet (Russian) theatre, television and movie actress
 Věra Soukupová (born 1932), Czech mezzo-soprano
 Vera Stanley Alder (1898–1984), English portrait painter and mystic
 Vera Steadman (1900–1966), American film actress of the silent era
 Vera Storozheva (born 1958), Russian actress and film director
 Vera Stroyeva (1903–1991), Soviet film director and screenwriter
 Vera Suchánková (1932–2004), Czechoslovak pair skater
 Věra Suková (1931–1982), Czech tennis player
Vera Summers (born 1899), Australian high school teacher and principal
 Vera Sveshnikova (born 1987), Russian musical theatre actress and singer 
 Vera Szemere (1923–1995), Hungarian actress

T
 Vera Telenius (1912–1991), Finnish singer
 Vera Thomas (1921–1995), English table tennis player
 Vera Thulin (1893–1974), Swedish freestyle swimmer
 Vera Timanova (1855–1942), Russian pianist
 Vera Trefilova (1875–1943), Russian dancer and teacher
 Vera Tschechowa (born 1940), German film actress

U
 Vera Ulyakina (born 1986), Russian volleyball player

V
 Vera Vague (1906–1974), American actress, also known by her real name of Barbara Jo Allen
 Věra Vančurová (1932–2018), Czech gymnast
 Vera Vasilchikova (1780–1814), Russian minor aristocrat
 Vera Veljkov-Medaković (1923–2011), Serbian pianist and piano teacher
 Vera Venczel (1946–2021), Hungarian actress
 Vera Viczián (born 1972), Hungarian cross country skier
 Vera Volkova (1905–1975), Russian ballet dancer and dance teacher
 Vera Voronina (1905–?), Russian actress
 Věra Votrubcová, Czechoslovak table tennis player
 Věra Vovsová (1912–1998), Czech painter

W
 Vera Wang (born 1949), American fashion designer
 Vera Weizmann (1881–1966), Russian-born Israeli medical doctor and a Zionist activist
 Vera White (1893-1949), American silent film actress
 Vera Williams (1927–2015), American children's writer and illustrator
 Vera Woodhouse, Lady Terrington (1889–1973), British Liberal Party politician

Y
 Vera Yurasova (1928–2023), Russian physicist

Z
 Vera Zasulich (1849–1919), Russian Marxist writer and revolutionary
 Vera Zavitsianou (1927–2008), Greek Greek theatre actress
 Vera Zhelikhovsky (1835–1896), Russian writer
 Vera Zorina (1917–2003), American actress
 Vera Zorina (singer) (1853–1903), Russian operetta singer
 Vera Zozulya (born 1956), Latvian-born Soviet luger
 Vera Zvonareva (born 1984), Russian tennis player

Fictional characters
Vera, a character in the 2021 Canadian-American movie Mister Sister
Vera, a character on the Spanish children's television program Barrio Sésamo
Vera, a character from Tolstoy's novel War and Peace
Vera, a character from Lermontov's novel A Hero of Our Time
Vera is the name given to a gun by Jayne Cobb in the television show Firefly
Vera Adare, character from V.C. Andrews' standalone novel, My Sweet Audrina
Vera Bennett, character from Prisoner:Cell Block H, an Australian soap opera
Vera Claythorne, character from Agatha Christie's novel And Then There Were None
Vera Dietz, the titular character of the young adult novel by A.S. King, Please Ignore Vera Dietz
Vera Donovan, a character from Stephen King's novel Dolores Claiborne
Vera Douka, fictional character in the ANT1 television series Erotas
Vera Drake, title character of a 2004 British Mike Leigh film
Vera Duckworth, a character from the British soap opera, Coronation Street
Vera Eliashvili, a character from the popular Russian book “Genius”
Vera Juarez, character from the British television soap opera Torchwood: Miracle Day
Vera Keyes, a character from Fallout: New Vegas of the DLC, Dead Money
Vera, one of the "Macaw Sisters" played by Anna Stolli in the original 2015 Edinburgh cast of Love Birds: the musical'
Vera Möldersm, a character from Strike WitchesVera Nair, a survivor in the video game Identity VVera Peterson, an unseen character on the television show CheersVera Sweet, a character from DC Comics, and love interest to the Creeper''
Vera Stanhope, character in a series of detective novels by Ann Cleeves and the television series Vera based on these novels

See also
 Vera (surname)
 Vera (disambiguation)

References

Russian feminine given names
English feminine given names
German feminine given names
Scandinavian feminine given names
Serbian feminine given names
Swedish feminine given names
Greek feminine given names

fr:Vera